Wissam Ben Bahri is a paralympic athlete from Tunisia competing mainly in category F20 long jump and high jump events.

Wissam competed at the 1996 Summer Paralympics where he won a silver medal in the long jump as well as competing in the 200m.  He won a second silver in the long jump at the 2000 Summer Paralympics where he also won a gold in the high jump and competed in the 100m.

References

Paralympic athletes of Tunisia
Athletes (track and field) at the 1996 Summer Paralympics
Athletes (track and field) at the 2000 Summer Paralympics
Paralympic gold medalists for Tunisia
Paralympic silver medalists for Tunisia
Living people
Medalists at the 1996 Summer Paralympics
Medalists at the 2000 Summer Paralympics
Tunisian long jumpers
Tunisian male high jumpers
Year of birth missing (living people)
Paralympic medalists in athletics (track and field)
20th-century Tunisian people
21st-century Tunisian people